Venlo dialect (Dutch and ) is the city dialect and a variant of Limburgish spoken in the Dutch city of Venlo alongside the Dutch language (with which it is not mutually intelligible). It belongs to South Guelderish Limburgish, which is a group of transitional dialects between Kleverlands and East Limburgish spoken in the northern part of Netherlands Limburg. That group of dialects is also known by its Dutch name Mich-kwartier ("Mich area", based on the usage of   instead of the Brabantian   as the accusative form of  'I').

Phonology

Vowels

  is restricted to unstressed syllables.
  is near-close .
  is the only "short open E" sound in the dialect.
  is somewhat 'laxer'  than in Standard Dutch.

Pitch accent

As many other Limburgish dialects, the Venlo dialect features a contrastive pitch accent, with minimal pairs such   'to rinse' vs.   'to play' and   'legs' vs.   'leg', with the first word in each pair featuring Accent 1 (left unmarked) and the second word Accent 2 (transcribed as a high tone).

Bibliography

 
 

Culture of Limburg (Netherlands)
South Guelderish Limburgish
Languages of the Netherlands
Low Franconian languages
Venlo

References